The group stage and main round ran from 1 October 2011 until 11 March 2012.

Group stage
The qualified teams were seeded in four pots.
The group stage of the 2011–12 EHF Women's Champions League was held from 29 September 2011 till 13 November 2012. The top two teams advanced to the second round.

Seedings

Group A

Group B

Group C

Group D

Main round
The main round was held between 4 February – 11 March 2012.

The draw of the main round was held on 15 November 2011 at the Gartenhotel Altmannsdorf in Vienna. A total of eight teams advanced from the group stage to the main round and were located in two pots, with the group winners being in Pot 1 and the runners-up in Pot 2. Teams from the same groups at the group stage were not able to be drawn together.

Seedings

Group 1

Group 2

References

External links
EHF Site

2011–12 Women's EHF Champions League